Sukhdeep Brar is a Canadian cricketer. He made his List A debut for Canada in the 2018–19 Regional Super50 tournament on 3 October 2018.

References

External links
 

Year of birth missing (living people)
Living people
Canadian cricketers
Place of birth missing (living people)